Farah Abadi (born 18 January 1988 in Västervik) is a Swedish television and radio presenter who works for Sveriges Television (SVT) and Sveriges Radio (SR).

Career
Between 2012 and 2014, she was a radio presenter for the Sveriges Radio station Din Gata 100,6 for local Malmö transmissions. She then made her television debut when she presented the kids summer show Sommarlov, broadcast on SVT, along with Malin Olsson,  and Alexander Hermansson. She co-hosted the show again in 2015, without Olsson.

Between 2014 and 2015, she presented her own show, P3 med Farah Abadi, on Sveriges Radio. In 2015, she was "public ambassador" during Musikhjälpen along with singer Oscar Zia. She also presented  on Sveriges Radio along with, among others, Arantxa Alvarez. In 2016, she was again public ambassador at Musikhjälpen, which that year was broadcast from Örebro.

During the Eurovision Song Contest 2016, Abadi was a reporter for the Swedish preview show called Studio Eurovision.

In December 2017, she was one of the presenters for Musikhjälpen in Umeå. She continued to present the program in 2018 from Lund, in 2019 from Västerås, and in 2020 from Stockholm.

Between February and March 2022, she co-hosted Melodifestivalen (the Swedish national selection for the ) alongside Oscar Zia. Her role involved following the artists along the course of the event. Abadi hosted Melodifestivalen 2023 alongside Jesper Rönndahl.

References

External links

Living people
1988 births
Swedish television hosts
Swedish radio presenters
Swedish women radio presenters
Swedish women television presenters
Swedish people of Palestinian descent
People from Västervik Municipality